Dundee is a village in Yates County, New York, United States. The population was 1,725 at the 2010 census. The name was taken from Dundee, the city in Scotland with a population of 148,260.

The Village of Dundee is in the Town of Starkey. The village is in the Finger Lakes Region of New York, halfway between Elmira and Geneva.

Dundee Airport (D48) is located northeast of the village.

History 
The community was known early by the name "Plainview". At first, the village did not thrive due to competition from another neighboring community, "Eddytown", but eventually prevailed over its rival.

Around 1834, residents began to seek a new name for the village and, persuaded by a native of Scotland, named the village "Dundee". He then moved to Illinois and persuaded the natives of his new home to rename their community "Dundee".

In 1859, 1860, and 1861, the village was severely damaged by fires.

Dundee was the original home of Seneca Foods.

The Uriah Hair House, Dundee Methodist Church, First Presbyterian Church, and Dundee Village Historic District are listed on the National Register of Historic Places.

Geography
Dundee is located at  (42.524453, -76.974804).

Seneca Lake, one of the Finger Lakes, is four miles east of Dundee. Big Stream is a stream flowing through the village. "Big Stream" is also known for its seasonal fishing.

Dundee is on New York State Route 14A, a north-south  highway. New York State Route 230 terminates at NY-14A west of Dundee.

Demographics

As of the census of 2000, there were 1,690 people, 661 households, and 403 families residing in the village. The population density was 1,506.0 people per square mile (582.6/km2). There were 728 housing units at an average density of 648.7 per square mile (251.0/km2). The racial makeup of the village was 98.11% White, 1.01% African American, Hispanic or Latino of any race 0.65%, 0.47% from two or more races, 0.18% from other races, 0.12% Native American, and 0.12% Asian.

There were 661 households, out of which 34.5% had children under the age of 18 living with them, 40.7% were married couples living together, 15.3% had a female householder with no husband present, and 39.0% were non-families. 32.8% of all households were made up of individuals, and 15.4% had someone living alone who was 65 years of age or older. The average household size was 2.45 and the average family size was 3.07.

In the village, the population was spread out, with 27.6% under the age of 18, 7.0% from 18 to 24, 26.7% from 25 to 44, 21.5% from 45 to 64, and 17.2% who were 65 years of age or older. The median age was 38 years. For every 100 females, there were 88.0 males. For every 100 females age 18 and over, there were 87.9 males.

The median income for a household in the village was $26,034, and the median income for a family was $32,446. Males had a median income of $28,875 versus $20,885 for females. The per capita income for the village was $14,858. About 15.8% of families and 17.0% of the population were below the poverty line, including 22.2% of those under age 18 and 9.5% of those age 65 or over.

Notable people
Henry Harpending, Anthropologist
John T. Andrews, former US Congressman
Harry J. Malony, Major General World War II, commanded the 94th Infantry Div
Albert D. Walton, former US Attorney

References

1848 establishments in New York (state)
Populated places established in 1848
Villages in Yates County, New York
Villages in New York (state)